The 2015–16 EHF Cup group stage, corresponding to the fourth round of the 2015–16 EHF Cup, will be played from 11 February to 27 March 2016.

Format
Sixteen teams, advancing from the third round, were drawn into four groups of four teams. In each group, teams play each other in a double round-robin system with home-and-away matches. Group winners and runners-up teams will advance to the knockout stage.

Seedings
The seedings were published on 29 November 2015, and the draw took place on 3 December at 11:00 local time, in Vienna, Austria.

Group A

Group B

Group C

Group D

References

External links
 (official website)

EHF Cup seasons
2015 in handball